Četiri godine is the eighth studio album by Yugoslavian pop-folk singer Lepa Brena and her band Slatki Greh. It was released 21 September 1989 through the record label Diskoton.

All of the songs became huge hits, but the song "Jugoslovenka" (sung with Alen Islamović, Danijel Popović and Vlado Kalember) is still today a well-known song all over the Balkans. It is considered an anthem to Yugonostalgists.

The music video for "Čuvala me mama" was filmed on the Croatian island Lopud.

This was her ninth of twelve albums with Slatki Greh.

This album was sold in a circulation of 650,000 copies.

Track listing

Personnel

Instruments
Jose Luis Iglesias – electric guitar

Production and recording
Enrique Kintana – recording
Vladimir Negovanović – recording

References

1989 albums
Lepa Brena albums
Diskoton albums
Serbo-Croatian language albums